Toni Leander Hannula (born 30 April 1962 in Savukoski) is a Finnish former wrestler who competed in the 1984 Summer Olympics.

References

External links
 

1962 births
Living people
Olympic wrestlers of Finland
Wrestlers at the 1984 Summer Olympics
Finnish male sport wrestlers